is a railway station in the city of Gosen, Niigata Prefecture, Japan, operated by East Japan Railway Company (JR East).

Lines

Station layout
The station consists of one ground-level side platform serving a single bi-directional track. The station is attended.

History
The station opened on 20 February 1952. With the privatization of Japanese National Railways (JNR) on 1 April 1987, the station came under the control of JR East.

Passenger statistics
In fiscal 2017, the station was used by an average of 740 passengers daily (boarding passengers only).

Surrounding area
 Gosen High School

External links
 JR East station information

References

Railway stations in Niigata Prefecture
Ban'etsu West Line
Railway stations in Japan opened in 1956
Gosen, Niigata